Hector John Ross (28 April 1899 – 10 January 1978) is a former Australian rules footballer who played with Carlton and Collingwood in the Victorian Football League (VFL).

Notes

External links 

Hector Ross's profile at Blueseum

1899 births
1978 deaths
Carlton Football Club players
Collingwood Football Club players
Australian rules footballers from Melbourne
Northcote Football Club players
People from Fairfield, Victoria